was a Japanese actor and voice actor.

His best known works are voicing Shinnosuke's father Hiroshi Nohara in the long-running anime series Crayon Shin-chan, Maes Hughes in Fullmetal Alchemist, Holland in Eureka Seven, Axel in Kingdom Hearts, Leorio in Hunter × Hunter, Shiro Fujimoto in Ao no Exorcist, Shingo Shoji in Initial D, Zenzo Hattori in Gintama and Esidisi in JoJo's Bizarre Adventure: Battle Tendency.

In the live-action field, he was most known for dubbing actor Robert Downey Jr. as Iron Man/Tony Stark.

Fujiwara founded his own talent management and production company, Air Agency, in 2006.

Biography 
Fujiwara was born in Tokyo. He spent the majority of his childhood in Iwate Prefecture. In high school, he handled vocals in a band he formed with his friend Kotaro Furuichi, future guitarist of rock band The Collectors.

Around 18, he moved back to Tokyo on his own and joined the Bungakuza acting school. He spent the 1980s performing in several theater troupes while working odd jobs. Fujiwara was introduced to his first voice acting agency, Ken Production, in the early 1990s. The first TV anime in which he appeared as a regular was Yokoyama Mitsuteru Sangokushi, but his breakout role was Hiroshi Nohara in Crayon Shin-chan.

In November 2006, he left Ken Production and founded his own agency, Air Agency. Aside from talent management, the company went on to release original drama and situation CDs through its child company Air Label, as well as produce live events. In 2010, Fujiwara made his own sound directorial debut in Kakkokawaii Sengen!

Fujiwara was a regular lecturer at the Japan Newart College since 2008.

In August 2016, Air Agency announced that Fujiwara was sick, and tested positive for cancer. He officially resumed work in June 2017. Fujiwara died from the disease on April 12, 2020.

Filmography

Television animation

Theatrical animation

Original video animation (OVA)

Video games

Tokusatsu

Dubbing roles

Live-action

Animated

Narration 
The below is a selection.

Live-Action

The following are physical appearances as opposed to voice work.

Discography

Drama CD roles

Character songs

Video / Events

Web radio hosting

Sound direction

Substitutes
Below is a list of voice actors who stood in for him during his health-related hiatus (2016–2017), and after his death in 2020.

Kenyū Horiuchi – Pokémon Generations: Handsome/Looker
Hiroaki Hirata – Blue Exorcist: Kyoto Saga: Shirō Fujimoto
Kenjirō Tsuda – Attack on Titan 2nd Season: Hannes, Space Battleship Yamato 2202: Warriors of Love, Isami Enomoto
Toshiyuki Morikawa – Crayon Shin-chan series: Hiroshi Nohara, Eureka Seven Hi-Evolution: Holland Novak, : Hughtlom Aubreykahn, Marvel Cinematic Universe:Iron Man/Tony Stark
Mitsuru Ogata – Macross Delta: Berger Stone
Yasunori Matsumoto – Mr. Robot: Mr. Robot
Kazuya Nakai – The Night Is Short, Walk on Girl: Seitaro Higuchi
Kanehira Yamamoto – Senran Kagura: Peach Beach Splash: Mr. K (Kiriya)
Jin Yamanoi – The Strain: Vasiliy Fet
Kazuhiro Yamaji – Granblue Fantasy: Eugen (originally only on the first season of the anime)
Rikiya Koyama – Dance with Devils: Fortuna: Nesta
Kazuhiko Inoue – Scream Queens: Wes Gardner
Tomokazu Seki – Re:Zero -Starting Life in Another World- Death or Kiss: Aldebaran
Tōru Ōkawa - Laughing Under the Clouds: Taiko Kumou
Fuminori Komatsu - : Travis Kirkland - Utawarerumono'': Haku (Used for extra scenes new to Utawarerumono ZAN 2/replaced entirely for the anime adaptation of Utawarerumono Futari no Hakuoro. Also used for other character variants in Utawarerumono: Lost Frag.)

References

External links
 Official agency profile 
 

1964 births
2020 deaths
Deaths from cancer in Japan
Japanese company founders
Japanese male video game actors
Japanese male voice actors
Male voice actors from Tokyo
20th-century Japanese male actors
21st-century Japanese male actors